Bill Cosby is a Very Funny Fellow...Right! is the debut album release by Bill Cosby. It was recorded live at the nightclub The Bitter End in New York City's Greenwich Village during early 1963. The album includes three sketches about Noah.

Sean Carruthers of AllMusic rated the album four-and-a-half stars out of five, saying that "Those who only know Bill Cosby as an '80s television star and product pitchman don't know how truly funny and edgy he used to be when he first started out."

Vinyl copies of the album had all the words of the title on the front cover in magenta. The compact disc changed the color to black. Additionally, the compact disc removed the words "Produced by Allan Sherman" which appeared underneath the title on the front cover of the vinyl album cover.

Track listing
All content written by Bill Cosby.

Side one
A Nut in Every Car - 3:15
Toss of the Coin - 2:11
Little Tiny Hairs - 1:46
Noah: Right! - 3:35
Noah: and the Neighbor - 1:16
Noah: Me and You, Lord - 3:02

Side two
Superman - 1:04
Hoof and Mouth - 1:46
Greasy Kid Stuff - 3:07
The Difference Between Men and Women - 2:14
Pep Talk - 1:46
Karate - 5:11

References

1963 debut albums
Bill Cosby live albums
Stand-up comedy albums
Spoken word albums by American artists
Live spoken word albums
1963 live albums
Warner Records live albums
Albums produced by Allan Sherman
1960s comedy albums
1960s spoken word albums
Albums recorded at the Bitter End